Sir Archibald Murray of Blackbarony, 3rd Baronet (died before 28 May 1700), was a Scottish soldier, parliamentary commissioner and Gentleman.

He was the son of Sir Alexander Murray, 2nd Baronet of Blackbarony, Sheriff of Peeblesshire (died c.1698), and Margaret Cockburn. He married Mary, eldest daughter of William Keith, 7th Earl Marischal, and they had seven children.

He served as a commissioner for Peeblesshire in the Parliament of Scotland in 1661–63, 1665, 1667, 1669–74, 1678, 1681–82, 1685–86 and 1689–98.

On 1 December 1669, Murray was appointed Lieutenant-Colonel in the Militia Regiment of the counties of Linlithgowshire and Peeblesshire, by King Charles II. He was appointed to a commission in 1680, charged with seeking out and punishing Covenanters in Peeblesshire, particularly those who had been at the Battle of Bothwell Brig in 1679.

He was appointed "Sole Master of Work, Overseer, and Director-General of their Majesties' buildings" on 24 December 1689 by King William III, filling the post which had been vacant since Sir William Bruce's dismissal in 1678.

References

|-

1700 deaths
Baronets in the Baronetage of Nova Scotia
Masters of Work to the Crown of Scotland
16th-century Scottish people
16th-century architects
Scottish soldiers
Year of birth unknown
Year of death missing
Members of the Parliament of Scotland 1661–1663
Members of the Convention of the Estates of Scotland 1665
Members of the Convention of the Estates of Scotland 1667
Members of the Parliament of Scotland 1669–1674
Members of the Convention of the Estates of Scotland 1678
Members of the Parliament of Scotland 1681–1682
Members of the Parliament of Scotland 1685–1686
Members of the Convention of the Estates of Scotland 1689
Members of the Parliament of Scotland 1689–1702